Sambhram Institute of Technology was started in 2001 in Bangalore, Karnataka, India. It is affiliated to Visvesvaraya Technological University and approved by AICTE. It is also accredited by National Board of Accreditation (NBA). The campus is situated in M.S.Palya, Jalahalli East, Bangalore-97, India.

Courses offered
Mechanical Engineering 
Computer Science and Engineering 
Information Science and Engineering 
Electronics and Communication Engineering 
Civil Engineering

Verticals 
Under the direction of the Apex Foundation, the Sambhram Group of Institutions was founded in 1991. Through the Sambhram Education Trust, the organization manages 12 educational institutions in the states of Karnataka and Andhra Pradesh that provide instruction at the secondary, pre-university, and tertiary levels. As part of the Sambhram Group of Institutions, the following schools and colleges are listed:

 Sambhram Institute of Technology
 Sambhram Academy of Management Studies
 Sambhram College of Hotel Management
 Sambhram Institute of Medical Sciences and Research
 KGF College of Dental Sciences and Hospital
 Sambhram College and Institute of Nursing - KGF
 Sambhram Degree College, Chittoor
 Sambhram Pre-University College - KGF
 Sambhram Pre-University College
 Sambhram Junior College Chittoor
 Sambhram School - Chittoor

References

External links

The Computer Science and Engineering Students' forum

Engineering colleges in Bangalore
Affiliates of Visvesvaraya Technological University
Educational institutions established in 2001
2001 establishments in Karnataka